Miguel Angel Gomez Garro (born February 24, 1961, in Guipúzcoa) is a boccia player from Spain.  He has a physical disability: He has cerebral palsy and is a BC1 type athlete.  He competed at the 1996 Summer Paralympics.  He finished first in the BC1/BC2 team event.

References 

Spanish boccia players
Living people
1961 births
Paralympic gold medalists for Spain
Boccia players at the 1996 Summer Paralympics
Sportspeople from Gipuzkoa
Paralympic boccia players of Spain
Paralympic medalists in boccia
Medalists at the 1996 Summer Paralympics